Dichomeris xanthodeta is a moth in the family Gelechiidae. It was described by Edward Meyrick in 1913. It is found in Mpumalanga, South Africa.

The wingspan is 16–17 mm. The forewings are lilac fuscous with the costa narrowly deep orange throughout and with a dark fuscous terminal line. The hindwings are grey.

References

Endemic moths of South Africa
Moths described in 1913
xanthodeta